Robert Brackett Elliott (March 26, 1923 – February 2, 2016) was an American comedian and actor, one-half of the comedy duo of Bob and Ray. He was the father of comedian/actor Chris Elliott and grandfather of actress and comedians Abby Elliott and Bridey Elliott. He is most remembered for the character of radio reporter Wally Ballou.

Life and career
Elliott was born in Winchester, Massachusetts, the son of Gail Marguarite (née Brackett), a needleworker, and Fred Russell Elliott, who worked in insurance. Bob Elliott served In the U.S. Army in Northern Europe in WWII.  On radio, he appeared in programs with his long-time partner Ray Goulding. These were in different series and time slots over decades, beginning in the late 1940s at Boston's WHDH radio on the show Matinee with Bob and Ray.

 On television, Elliott and Goulding hosted Bob and Ray from 1951 to 1953. He appeared on a number of other television programs, including Happy Days; Newhart; and Bob & Ray, Jane, Laraine & Gilda in 1979 (with Goulding, Jane Curtin, Laraine Newman and Gilda Radner); The David Steinberg Show; and Saturday Night Live. In 1982, Elliott was in Author! Author! as Patrick Dicker. He would star in made-for-TV-Movie's such as Between Time and Timbuktu and FDR: A One Man Show. Elliott also made television commercials, and co-wrote some humor articles with Ray Goulding for Mad Magazine in the 1950s.

In 1970, the duo debuted in The Two and Only on Broadway. Bob and Goulding worked together up until Goulding's death in 1990.

Solo works
In 1990, Elliott portrayed a bank guard in Quick Change. In 1990, he portrayed "Fred Peterson" in the television series Get a Life, which starred Chris as his son. Four years later, the elder Elliott appeared in the Tim Burton production Cabin Boy, playing Chris's father again. In 2004, he appeared in a skit on the Air America radio program The O'Franken Factor. Elliott appeared on radio with Garrison Keillor in The American Radio Company of the Air.

Personal life
Elliott married Jane Underwood in 1943. They divorced in 1953, having no children. Bob and Ray writer Raymond Knight died in 1953. In 1954, Elliott married Knight's widow, Lee (née Peppers). They were married for 58 years until her death in 2012. They had two sons, Chris Elliott and Bob Elliott Jr., and one daughter, Amy Andersen. They adopted Lee and Ray Knight's two children, Colony Elliott Santangelo and Shannon Elliott.  They had 11 grandchildren and five great-grandchildren. 

In 1989, Elliott co-authored son Chris's mock autobiography, Daddy's Boy: A Son's Shocking Account of Life with a Famous Father.

Death
Elliott died in Cundy's Harbor, Maine on February 2, 2016, from throat cancer at the age of 92.

Filmography

Film

Television

References

External links

Larry Josephson's official Bob and Ray site
Portland Monthly: Elliott family life in Maine
New York Times article about the Elliot family
Bob and Ray shows at the Internet Archive collection "Bob and Ray for the Truly Desperate" https://archive.org/details/bobandraytoaster

1923 births
2016 deaths
20th-century American male actors
American male comedians
American male film actors
American male radio actors
American male television actors
American male voice actors
American radio personalities
American humorists
American satirists
American comics writers
Mad (magazine) people
Deaths from cancer in Maine
Deaths from throat cancer
Male actors from Boston
Comedians from Massachusetts
20th-century American comedians
United States Army personnel of World War II